CANADA ROCKS! is a celebration of Canadian pop and rock songwriters, musicians and singers.  It is a full-length production that was performed in the 2005 and 2006 season of the Charlottetown Festival, hosted by the Confederation Centre of the Arts in Charlottetown, Prince Edward Island.

The production featured Atlantic Canadian blues artist Matt Minglewood, former Rawlins Cross vocalist Joey Kitson and vocalist Terry Hatty.
Canada Rocks!  was created  by Doug Gallant, Wade Lynch, Hank Stinson and Terry Hatty.
The production was workshopped at the Charlottetown Festival's David MacKenzie Theatre in 2004 to overwhelmingly positive response and brought to the festival's main stage the following season.
The show's creators considered more than 700 songs from 50 years of Canadian rock, pop, folk, country and traditional music before editing that list down to a more workable 200.
In the end the show featured some 75 songs from artists as diverse as Bachman–Turner Overdrive, Ron Hynes, Buffy St. Marie, Dr. Music, Mandala and The Rankins.
By the end of its second season at the festival in 2006 it had sold more than $1.2 million worth of tickets to become the second most successful musical in the festival's 40-plus year history, second only to Anne of Green Gables which has been playing since 1965.
Three of the show's creators, Gallant, Lynch and Stinson, are currently collaborating on another musical property for the stage and have two others in waiting.

See also
List of festivals in Prince Edward Island
List of music festivals in Canada

Rock festivals in Canada
Music festivals in Charlottetown
2005 in Canadian music